Giovanni Batista "Jack" de Manio MC and Bar (26 January 1914 – 28 October 1988) was a British journalist, best known as a radio presenter.

Life and work
He was the son of Jean and Florence de Manio. His father was an Italian aviator, who died in a flying accident before he was born; his mother was Polish. He attended Aldenham School in Hertfordshire. As a young man he worked as an invoice clerk and then as a waiter. He joined the British Army and was commissioned as a second lieutenant into the Royal Sussex Regiment in 1939 and during World War II fought with the British Expeditionary Force (BEF) in 1939–40 and was awarded the Military Cross. On 20 March 1944, as a lieutenant, he was dismissed from the service following a Field General Court-Martial.

De Manio's first experience of radio came when he joined the Forces Broadcasting Unit in Beirut in 1944. He became an announcer on the BBC Overseas Service on leaving the army in 1946. He transferred to the Home Service in 1950.

De Manio's career nearly crashed in 1956 when he was duty announcer for the BBC's Home Service. A major radio feature, The Land of the Niger, was broadcast worldwide to mark a Royal visit to Nigeria. Carelessly, he back-announced it as 'The Land of the Nigger'. There was outrage; he was immediately suspended and then returned to the General Overseas Service.

In 1958 de Manio was chosen to present the morning current affairs programme Today, which had begun a few months earlier. The programme was less hard news oriented than it would eventually become and was well suited to de Manio's relaxed, humorous style. He became famous for the number of occasions on which he gave the time incorrectly. In 1969 he was the first radio broadcaster to be permitted to interview Prince Charles. He was voted British Radio Personality of the Year in 1964 and 1971. In 1970 the programme format was changed so that there were two presenters each day. Uneasy with the new format, de Manio left the following year.

At the point of his departure, de Manio was considered out-of-step with the news values of the BBC. The World at One had successfully brought to the BBC the best of Fleet Street values and a hardened newspaper editor in the form of William Hardcastle. Hardcastle contrasted unflatteringly with de Manio – whom David Hendy described in Life on Air: A History of Radio 4 as "a Bentley-driving habitué of Chelsea and the clubs of St James, complete with a rich gin and tonic voice". Sue MacGregor disliked de Manio's "golf-club bore attitude to anything foreign".

From 1971 to 1978 de Manio presented an afternoon show, Jack de Manio Precisely on Radio 4. Subsequently, he was an occasional contributor to Woman's Hour.

His home was a flat on Chelsea Embankment in London.

Personal life
He married first in 1935 Juliet Gravaeret Kaufmann of New York. They had a son. The marriage was dissolved in 1946. He was married for a second time in 1947 in Chelsea, London, Loveday Elizabeth Matthews, a widow (née Abbott), (2 February 1917 – April 1999).

Selected bibliography
To Auntie with Love. London: Hutchinson, 1967. . Autobiography.
Life Begins Too Early: A Sort of Autobiography. London: Hutchinson, 1970. .

Footnotes

External links
The Radio Academy: Jack de Manio
British Army Officers 1939−1945

1914 births
1988 deaths
BBC Radio 4 presenters
British Army personnel of World War II
British male journalists
British radio people
British radio personalities
English people of Italian descent
People educated at Aldenham School
Royal Sussex Regiment officers
Recipients of the Military Cross